Mars Attacks! is a 1996 American science fiction comedy film directed by Tim Burton, who also co-produced it with Larry J. Franco. The screenplay by Jonathan Gems was based on the Topps trading card series of the same name. The film features an ensemble cast consisting of Jack Nicholson (in a dual role), Glenn Close, Annette Bening, Pierce Brosnan, Danny DeVito, Martin Short, Sarah Jessica Parker, Michael J. Fox, Rod Steiger, Tom Jones, Lukas Haas,  Pam Grier, Natalie Portman, Jim Brown, Jack Black, Lisa Marie, and Sylvia Sidney in her final film role.

Alex Cox had tried to make a Mars Attacks film in the 1980s before Burton and Gems began development in 1993. When Gems turned in his first draft in 1994, Warner Bros. commissioned rewrites from Gems, Burton, Scott Alexander and Larry Karaszewski in an attempt to lower the budget to $60 million. The final production budget came to $80 million, while Warner Bros. spent another $20 million on the Mars Attacks! marketing campaign. Filming took place from February to June 1996. The film was shot in California, Nevada, Kansas, Arizona and Argentina.

The filmmakers hired Industrial Light & Magic to create the Martians using computer animation after their previous plan to use stop motion animation, supervised by Barry Purves, fell through because of budget limitations. Mars Attacks! was released theatrically by Warner Bros. Pictures in the United States on December 13, 1996, and received mixed reviews from critics. The film grossed approximately $101 million in box office totals, which was seen as a disappointment. Mars Attacks! was nominated for the Hugo Award for Best Dramatic Presentation and earned multiple nominations at the Saturn Awards.

Plot

When Earth is visited by a massive fleet of flying saucers from Mars, President of the United States James Dale addresses the people of the United States. Talk show host Nathalie Lake and her boyfriend, news reporter Jason Stone, attempt to capitalize on the developing story with an interview with President Dale's scientific advisor Professor Donald Kessler, which is unexpectedly interrupted by a broadcast from the Martian leader. As the Martians prepare to land outside Pahrump, Nevada, numerous people around the country react to their arrival, including donut shop employee Richie Norris and his older brother Billy Glenn, flamboyant casino operator Art Land and his hippie wife Barbara, divorced ex-boxer Byron Williams and his former wife Louise, and Byron and Louise's children Cedric and Neville.

Against the advice of the hawkish General Decker, President Dale chooses to greet the Martians as foreign dignitaries, ordering military officer General Casey to welcome them to Earth. Billy Glenn, a private in the US Army, is among the soldiers who volunteers to accompany General Casey as he greets the Martians in Nevada. Despite the translated message from the Martian ambassador stating that the Martians "come in peace", they turn on the assembled crowd and attack them with rayguns, killing General Casey, Jason, and Billy Glenn, and abducting Nathalie and her pet chihuahua Poppy.

Kessler convinces President Dale that the Martians' attack in Nevada may have been the result of a cultural misunderstanding, and President Dale agrees to let the Martian ambassador address Congress after the Martians issue a formal apology for their actions. Once again, the Martians turn on the assembled humans, massacring most of Congress and abducting Kessler. While Nathalie and Kessler are held captive in the Martian mothership, the Martians switch Nathalie and Poppy's heads and reduce Kessler to a disembodied head.

President Dale narrowly survives an assassination attempt by a Martian disguised as an attractive blonde woman, who infiltrates the White House by seducing and killing his press secretary Jerry Ross. Following the assassination attempt, the Martians commence a full-scale invasion of Earth, attacking major cities throughout the world. When Martian soldiers overrun the White House, First Lady Marsha Dale is killed by a falling chandelier as President Dale escapes to a secure bunker. Shortly after, Land is killed when the Martians destroy his casino in Las Vegas.

In Las Vegas, Barbara prepares to flee to Tahoe in Art's private plane, and offers to let Byron accompany her. The pair are joined by Byron's co-worker Cindy and singer Tom Jones, who offers to pilot the plane. Meanwhile, Richie abandons his parents in their mobile home and goes to his grandmother Florence's retirement home to escort her to safety, leaving his parents to be killed by a Martian piloting a giant robot. At the retirement home, the Martians' brains unexpectedly explode when they hear Florence's record of Slim Whitman's yodeling on "Indian Love Call", revealing one of their only weaknesses.

Eventually, Martian soldiers breach President Dale's secure bunker, crushing General Decker after reducing him to minuscule size with a shrink ray, then leveling their weapons on everyone else in the bunker, causing many to be killed while others flee the bunker, leaving President Dale the last alive in the room. He makes an eloquent, impassioned speech exhorting the Martians to make peace with humanity, but the now teary-eyed Martian leader kills him with a fake-hand-prank device after offering a handshake.

Barbara, Byron, Cindy, and Tom Jones reach Art's plane, but find the runway overrun by a group of Martians led by the Martian ambassador. To buy time for his companions to escape, Byron steps forward to challenge the ambassador to a boxing match, and beats him to death before being seemingly overrun by Martians as the plane takes off. Around the world, the Martians are defeated as humans play "Indian Love Call" to incapacitate them.

In the aftermath of the war with the Martians, President Dale's teenage daughter Taffy awards the Congressional Medal of Honor to Richie and Florence. In Washington, D.C., Byron—who survived his encounter with the Martians—walks up to Louise's home to greet his family. In Tahoe, Barbara, Cindy, and Tom Jones emerge unharmed from a cavern.

Cast

Other notable actors to appear in the film include Willie Garson as Corporate Guy, John Roselius as GNN Boss, Michael Reilly Burke and Valerie Wildman as GNN Reporters, Rebecca Broussard as a Hooker, Steve Valentine as TV Director, Enrique Castillo as Hispanic Colonel, John Finnegan as Speaker of the House, Gregg Daniel as Lab Technician, and J. Kenneth Campbell as a Doctor. Ron Howard's father Rance Howard has a small part as a Texas Investor, while The Simpsons writer Josh Weinstein portrays the Hippie who sets loose the dove. Voice actor Frank Welker provided the voices of the Martians.

Production

Development
In 1985, Alex Cox pitched the idea of a film based on the Mars Attacks trading card series as a joint-production to Orion and Tristar Pictures. He wrote three drafts over the next four years, but was replaced by Martin Amis before Orion and Tristar placed Mars Attacks in turnaround.

Jonathan Gems, who had previously written multiple unproduced screenplays for director Tim Burton, came up with his own idea for a Mars Attacks film in 1993. The writer pitched both concepts of Mars Attacks and Dinosaurs Attack! to Burton, who both realized we couldn't do it because of Jurassic Park (1993). Steven Spielberg had done a movie with dinosaurs killing people. And there were rumors, at that time, that he was gonna do Jurassic Park #2, with dinosaurs coming to Los Angeles — that Dinosaurs Attack! would be too similar. Burton convinced Gems Mars Attacks! could be like a big ensemble-1970's disaster picture; they re-watched The Towering Inferno (1974) together, focusing on the Robert Wagner character, specifically how a featured player (movie star) is killed off early in the picture. Gems said, ‘after seeing that it all came to me fairly quickly. And, in about a week, I had it roughed out: the story and the characters. And when I finished it, I realized it was inevitably going to be – it couldn't help being – a portrait of America because, following the Irwin Allen formula, I’d sketched out a range of different characters from different walks of life, and placed the action in different locations — in this case: California, Nevada, Kansas, New York, Mount Rushmore in Washington D.C.’

Burton, who was busy preparing Ed Wood (1994), believed that Mars Attacks! would be a perfect opportunity to pay homage to the films of Edward D. Wood Jr., especially Plan 9 from Outer Space (1959), and other 1950s science fiction B movies, such as Invaders from Mars (1953), It Came from Outer Space (1953), The War of the Worlds (1953), Target Earth (1954), Invasion of the Body Snatchers (1956) and Earth vs. the Flying Saucers (1956).

Burton set Mars Attacks! up with Warner Bros. and the studio purchased the film rights to the trading card series on his behalf. The original theatrical release date was planned for the summer of 1996. Gems completed his original script in 1994, which was budgeted by Warner Bros. at $260 million. The studio wanted to make the film for no more than $60 million. After turning in numerous drafts, the studio grew frustrated with Gems after insisting he remove the film's cold open, specifically ‘the cows on fire’; they demanded there be no burning cows, but Gems contends he couldn't devise another sequence (albeit anything he and Burton could agree improved on his initial ‘barbecue bovines’ prologue). When Gems’ latest script revision still included burning cows the studio dismissed him; prior to leaving the project Gems recommended the writing-duo behind  Ed Wood, Scott Alexander and Larry Karaszewski as his replacement(s). Alexander and Karaszewski worked on the film through July 1995, focusing the characters and making the tone less satirical — they re-wrote the third act, incorporating the military and a finale that mirrored Independence Day (1996), according to Gems.

Gems eventually returned to the project, writing a total of 12 drafts of the script (well over 90% of the finished shooting script). Although he is credited with both the screen story and screenplay of Mars Attacks!, Gems dedicates his novelization of the movie to Burton, who "co-wrote the screenplay and didn't ask for a credit". Warner Bros. was dubious of the Martian dialogue and wanted Burton to add closed captioning subtitles, but he resisted. Working with Burton, Gems pared the film's 60 leading characters down to 23 and the worldwide destruction planned for the film was isolated to three major cities. Scenes featuring Martians attacking China, the Philippines, Japan, Europe, Africa, India and Russia were deleted from the screenplay, leaving only Paris, London and the Taj Mahal. "Bear in mind this was way before Independence Day (1996) was written," Gems commented. "We had things like Manhattan being destroyed building by building, the White House went and so did the Empire State Building. Warner Bros. figured all this would be too expensive, so we cut most of that out to reduce the cost." Further discussing the differences between Mars Attacks! and Independence Day, Gems stated, "Independence Day is more like a movie called Fail-Safe and Mars Attacks is like Dr. Strangelove", in that both films had a similar story, but with different tones. Howard Stern claimed that the film's climax, where an attack by Martians was thwarted by playing Slim Whitman songs to them, was originally created by him when he worked at WNBC in 1982, in a sketch named  "Slim Whitman vs. The Midget Aliens From Mars."

Casting
The decision to hire an A-list ensemble cast for Mars Attacks! parallels the strategy Irwin Allen used for his disaster films, notably The Poseidon Adventure (1972) and The Towering Inferno (1974). Jack Nicholson, approached for the role of the President, jokingly remarked that he wanted to play all the roles. Burton agreed to cast Nicholson as both Art Land and President Dale, specifically remembering his positive working relationship with the actor on Batman.

Susan Sarandon was originally set to play Barbara Land before Annette Bening was cast. Bening modeled the character after Ann-Margret's performance in Viva Las Vegas (1964). Hugh Grant was the first choice for Professor Donald Kessler, a role which eventually went to Pierce Brosnan. Meryl Streep, Diane Keaton and Stockard Channing were considered for First Lady Marsha Dale, but Glenn Close won the role. In addition to Nicholson, other actors who reunited with Burton on Mars Attacks! include Sylvia Sidney from Beetlejuice (1988), O-Lan Jones from Edward Scissorhands (1990) and Danny DeVito from Batman Returns (1992), continuing Burton's trend of recasting actors several times from his previous works.

Roger L. Jackson, best known as the voice of Ghostface in the Scream film franchise, makes an uncredited appearance as the voice of the Martian translator device. His performance in Mars Attacks! helped him get the audition for Scream.

Filming
The originally scheduled start date was mid-August 1995, but filming was delayed until February 26, 1996. Director Tim Burton hired Peter Suschitzky as the cinematographer, because he was a fan of his work in David Cronenberg's films. Production designer Thomas Wynn (A Beautiful Mind, Malcolm X) intended to have the war room pay tribute to Dr. Strangelove (1964). During production, Burton insisted that the art direction, cinematography and costume design of Mars Attacks! incorporate the look of the 1960s trading cards.

On designing the Martian (played by Burton's girlfriend Lisa Marie Smith) who seduces and kills Jerry Ross (Martin Short), costume designer Colleen Atwood took combined inspiration from the playing cards, Marilyn Monroe, the work of Alberto Vargas and Jane Fonda in Barbarella (1968). Filming for Mars Attacks! ended on June 1, 1996. The film score was composed by Burton's regular composer Danny Elfman, to whom Burton was reconciled after a quarrel that occurred during The Nightmare Before Christmas (1993), for which they did not co-operate in producing Ed Wood (1994). Elfman enlisted the help of Oingo Boingo lead guitarist Steve Bartek to help arrange the compositions for the orchestra.

Visual effects

Tim Burton initially intended to use stop motion animation to feature the Martians, viewing it as a homage to the work of Ray Harryhausen, primarily Jason and the Argonauts. Similar to his own Beetlejuice, Burton "wanted to make [the special effects] look cheap and purposely fake-looking as possible." He first approached Henry Selick, director of The Nightmare Before Christmas, to supervise the stop motion work, but Selick was busy directing James and the Giant Peach, also produced by Burton. Despite the fact that Warner Bros. was skeptical of the escalating budget and had not yet greenlit the film for production, Burton hired Barry Purves to shepherd the stop motion work. Purves created an international team of about 70 animators, who worked on Mars Attacks! for eight months and began compiling test footage in Burbank, California. The department workers studied Gloria Swanson's choreography and movement as Norma Desmond in Sunset Boulevard for inspiration on the Martians' movement.

When the budget was projected at $100 million (Warner Bros. wanted it for no more than $75 million), producer Larry J. Franco commissioned a test reel from Industrial Light & Magic (ILM), the visual effects company he worked with on Jumanji. Burton was persuaded to change his mind to employ computer animation, which brought the final production budget to $80 million. Although Purves was uncredited for his work, stop motion supervisors Ian Mackinnon and Peter Saunders, who would later collaborate with Burton on Corpse Bride, received character design credit. Warner Digital Studios was responsible for the scenes of global destruction, airborne flying saucer sequences, the Martian landing in Nevada and the robot that chases Richie Norris in his pickup truck. Warner Digital also used practical effects, such as building scale models of Big Ben and other landmarks. The destruction of Art Land's hotel was footage of the real life nighttime demolition of the Landmark Hotel and Casino, a building Burton wished to immortalize.

Soundtrack

The film's music was composed by Danny Elfman. The soundtrack was released on March 4, 1997, by Atlantic Records.

Track listing

Reception

Release and box office
Warner Bros. spent $20 million on the movie's marketing campaign; together with $80 million spent during production, the final combined budget came to $100 million. A novelization, written by screenwriter Jonathan Gems, was published by Puffin Books in January 1997. The film was released in the United States on December 13, 1996, earning $9.38 million in its opening weekend. Mars Attacks! eventually made $37.77 million in U.S. totals and $63.6 million elsewhere, coming to a worldwide total of $101.37 million.

The film was considered a box office bomb in the U.S., but generally achieved greater success both critically and commercially in Europe. Many observers found similarities with Independence Day, which also came out in 1996. "It was just a coincidence. Nobody told me about it. I was surprised how close it was," director Tim Burton continued, "but then it's a pretty basic genre I guess. Independence Day was different in tone – it was different in everything. It almost seemed like we had done kind of a Mad magazine version of Independence Day." During the film's theatrical run in January 1997, TBS purchased the broadcasting rights of the film.

Critical reception
The film received mixed responses from critics. On review aggregator Rotten Tomatoes, the film holds an approval rating of 56% based on 86 reviews, with an average rating of 6.00/10. The website's critical consensus reads, "Tim Burton's alien invasion spoof faithfully recreates the wooden characters and schlocky story of cheesy '50s sci-fi and Ed Wood movies -- perhaps a little too faithfully for audiences." On Metacritic, the film received a score of 52 based on 19 reviews, indicating "mixed or average reviews".

Roger Ebert observed the homages to the 1950s science fiction B movies: "Ed Wood himself could have told us what's wrong with this movie: the makers felt superior to the material. To be funny, even schlock has to believe in itself. Look for Infra-Man (1975) or Invasion of the Bee Girls (1973) and you will find movies that lack stars and big budgets and fancy special effects but are funny and fun in a way that Burton's megaproduction never really understands."

Kenneth Turan of the Los Angeles Times wrote that "Mars Attacks! is all 1990s cynicism and disbelief, mocking the conventions that Independence Day takes seriously. This all sounds clever enough but in truth, Mars Attacks! is not as much fun as it should be. Few of its numerous actors make a lasting impression and Burton's heart and soul is not in the humor". Desson Thomson from The Washington Post said "Mars Attacks! evokes plenty of sci-fi classics, from The Day the Earth Stood Still (1951) to Dr. Strangelove (1964), but it doesn't do much beyond that superficial exercise. With the exception of Burton's jolting sight gags (I may never recover from the vision of Sarah Jessica Parker's head grafted on to the body of a chihuahua), the comedy is half-developed, pedestrian material. And the climactic battle between Earthlings and Martians is dull and overextended."

Richard Schickel, writing in Time magazine, gave a positive review. "You have to admire everyone's chutzpah: the breadth of Burton's (and writer Jonathan Gems') movie references, which range from Kurosawa to Kubrick; and above all their refusal to offer us a single likable character. Perhaps they don't create quite enough deeply funny earthlings to go around, but a thoroughly mean-spirited big-budget movie is always a treasurable rarity." Jonathan Rosenbaum from the Chicago Reader praised the surreal humor and black comedy, which he found to be in the vein of Dr. Strangelove and Gremlins (1984). He said it was far from clear whether the movie was a satire, although critics were describing it as one. Todd McCarthy of Variety called Mars Attacks! "a cult sci-fi comedy miscast as an elaborate, all-star studio extravaganza."

Audiences surveyed by CinemaScore gave the film a grade of "B" on a scale of A+ to F.

Awards
Mars Attacks! was on the shortlist for the Academy Award for Best Visual Effects nomination, but the Academy of Motion Picture Arts and Sciences selected Independence Day, Dragonheart, and Twister instead. The film was nominated for seven categories at the Saturn Awards. Danny Elfman won Best Music, while director Tim Burton, writer Jonathan Gems, actor Lukas Haas, costume designer Colleen Atwood and the visual effects department at Industrial Light & Magic received nominations. Mars Attacks! was nominated for both the Saturn Award for Best Science Fiction Film (which went to Independence Day) and the Hugo Award for Best Dramatic Presentation.

See also

 List of films featuring miniature people
List of films featuring extraterrestrials
 List of films set in Las Vegas
Mars in fiction

References

Further reading
 
 
 Thomas Kent Miller. Mars in the Movies: A History. Jefferson, North Carolina: McFarland & Company, 2016. .
 Ron Magid. "Attack Formation" in Cinescape, Volume 3, Number 4. Lombard, IL: MVP Entertainment, Inc., January/February 1997.
 Jonathan Gems. Mila Pop. (April 2021). Mars Attacks Memoirs. autobiographical. Quota Books. ISBN 9781916246041

External links

 
 
 
 
 
 Mars Attacks (complete card set) (archive) – from trading-cards.org
 Mars Attacks (Don Markstein's Toonopedia) (archive) – from the 2012 original

1996 films
1990s parody films
1990s science fiction comedy films 
American films with live action and animation
American parody films 
American science fiction comedy films 
Alien invasions in films 
Alien abduction films
Films about size change
Films about extraterrestrial life
Films about fictional presidents of the United States
Films based on trading cards
Films directed by Tim Burton
Films scored by Danny Elfman
Films set in Kansas
Films set in Kentucky
Films set in the Las Vegas Valley
Films set in New York City
Films set in Washington, D.C.
Films set in Argentina
Films set in the White House
Films shot in the Las Vegas Valley
Mars in film
Warner Bros. films
Retrofuturism
1996 comedy films
1990s English-language films
1990s American films